Fazelabad-e Talkhab (also Romanized as Fāz̤elābād-e Talkhāb) is a village in Sarfaryab Rural District, Sarfaryab District, Charam County, Kohgiluyeh and Boyer-Ahmad Province, Iran. At the 2006 census, its population was 51, in 9 families.

References 

Populated places in Charam County